Golfe du Morbihan - Vannes Agglomération is the communauté d'agglomération, an intercommunal structure, centred on the city of Vannes. It is located in the Morbihan department, in the Brittany region, northwestern France. It was created in January 2017 by the merger of the former Communauté d'agglomération Vannes Agglo with the former communautés de communes Loc'h Communauté and Presqu'île de Rhuys. Its area is 807.4 km2. Its population was 169,785 in 2018, of which 53,438 in Vannes proper.

Composition
The communauté d'agglomération consists of the following 34 communes:

Arradon
Arzon
Baden
Bono
Brandivy
Colpo
Elven
Grand-Champ
Le Hézo
Île-aux-Moines
Île-d'Arz
Larmor-Baden
Locmaria-Grand-Champ
Locqueltas
Meucon
Monterblanc
Plaudren
Plescop
Ploeren
Plougoumelen
Saint-Armel
Saint-Avé
Saint-Gildas-de-Rhuys
Saint-Nolff
Sarzeau
Séné
Sulniac
Surzur
Theix-Noyalo
Le Tour-du-Parc
Trédion
Treffléan
La Trinité-Surzur
Vannes

References

Agglomeration communities in France
Intercommunalities of Morbihan